Confalonieri is an Italian surname. Notable people with the surname include:

 Ansperto Confalonieri (died 7 December 881), archbishop of Milan from 861 to 881 
 Carlo Confalonieri (1893–1986), Italian Cardinal of the Roman Catholic Church
 Christina Confalonieri (born 1981), Italian-born South Korean broadcaster and radio host
 Corrado Confalonieri (1284–1351), Italian saint, penitent and hermit
 Diego Confalonieri (born 1979), Italian fencer
 Fedele Confalonieri (1937–), Italian manager, President of Venerable Factory of the Duomo of Milan 
 Federico Confalonieri (1785–1846), Italian revolutionist
 Giulio Confalonieri (1896–1972), Italian musician, musicologist, composer and musical critic
 Luigi Girolamo Cusani-Confalonieri, Ambassador of Italy to the United States from 1910 to 1914
 Maria Giulia Confalonieri (born 1993), Italian track and road racing cyclist
 Vittorio Badini Confalonieri (1914–1993), Italian politician

Italian-language surnames